Myles Jones (born March 15, 1993), is an American professional lacrosse player with Redwoods Lacrosse Club of the Premier Lacrosse League. He attended Walt Whitman High School in Huntington Station, New York, completed a post-graduate year at Salisbury School in Salisbury, Connecticut and played collegiate lacrosse at Duke University.

MLL career 
Jones was selected 1st overall in the 2016 Major League Lacrosse draft by the Atlanta Blaze. After just 2 games with Atlanta, he was traded to the Chesapeake Bayhawks along with Atlanta's 2017 2nd round college draft pick for midfielder Matt Mackrides and Chesapeake's 2017 1st round college draft pick.

In 2017, Jones was selected to the MLL All Star Game and was named the All Star Game MVP after scoring 4 goals and an assist, including the game winning goal.

PLL career 
In October 2018, it was announced that Jones was one of over 140 players who had signed contracts agreeing to play in the newly formed Premier Lacrosse League. Jones was selected to play in the 2019 PLL All-Star Game for Team Baptiste.

On February 29, 2020, Jones was traded from Chaos to Redwoods in exchange for Sergio Salcido and a second round pick in the 2020 PLL College Draft.

NLL career 
Jones was a fourth round pick of the New England Black Wolves in the 2016 NLL Entry Draft, however he never played for the team, citing unfamiliarity with the indoor game. On September 13, 2019, his rights were traded to the expansion New York Riptide, along with Ryan Fournier and the 24th overall pick in the 2019 NLL Entry Draft, in exchange for Jordan Dunston. On January 20, 2020, Jones agreed to a protected practice player contract with the Riptide of the National Lacrosse League, making his NLL debut five days later.

Awards and achievements

College 

 2013 NCAA Division I Men's Lacrosse Championship Winner (Duke)
 2014 NCAA Division I Men's Lacrosse Championship Winner (Duke)
 2014 USILA Second Team All-American
 2015 USILA First Team All-American
 2015 Lt. Donald MacLaughlin Jr. Award
 2016 USILA First Team All-American
 2016 Lt. Donald MacLaughlin Jr. Award

Professional 
 2019 PLL All-Star

Statistics

PLL
Reference:

MLL

NLL

NCAA

Endorsements 
On August 10, 2016 it was announced that Jones signed a multi-year endorsement deal with Adidas.

References

Living people
American lacrosse players
Lacrosse players from New York (state)
1993 births
Major League Lacrosse players
Duke Blue Devils men's lacrosse players
Lacrosse midfielders
Premier Lacrosse League players
Chesapeake Bayhawks players
People from Rockville Centre, New York
Sportspeople from Nassau County, New York
New York Riptide
National Lacrosse League players
Atlanta Blaze players
21st-century African-American sportspeople